The 2019–20 Cagliari Calcio season was the club's fourth season back in Serie A after being relegated at the end of the 2014–15 season. The club competed in Serie A and also competed in the Coppa Italia.

The season was coach Rolando Maran's second in charge of the club, following his departure from fellow mid-table side ChievoVerona. The pre-season marked the return of Belgian midfielder Radja Nainggolan after almost half a decade after leaving the club for Roma.

Players

Squad information

Transfers

In

Loans in

Out

Loans out

Pre-season and friendlies

Competitions

Serie A

League table

Results summary

Results by round

Matches

Coppa Italia

Statistics

Appearances and goals

|-
! colspan=14 style="background:#000080; color:#FF0000; text-align:center| Goalkeepers

|-
! colspan=14 style="background:#000080; color:#FF0000; text-align:center| Defenders

|-
! colspan=14 style="background:#000080; color:#FF0000; text-align:center| Midfielders

|-
! colspan=14 style="background:#000080; color:#FF0000; text-align:center| Forwards

|-
! colspan=14 style="background:#000080; color:#FF0000; text-align:center| Players transferred out during the season

Goalscorers

Last updated: 23 July 2020

Clean sheets

Last updated: 9 February 2020

Disciplinary record

Last updated: 9 February 2020

References

Cagliari Calcio seasons
Cagliari